The following is a non-definitive list of the film directors with the highest career film grosses . The list is not adjusted for inflation.

See also 
 List of highest-grossing actors
 List of highest-grossing film producers
 Lists of highest-grossing films
 List of highest-grossing films
 List of highest-grossing films in the United States and Canada

References

Gross, highest
Film box office
Top people lists
Film-related lists of superlatives